Jailor Gaari Abbayi  is a 1994 Indian Telugu-language action drama film written by the Paruchuri brothers and directed by Sarath. It stars Krishnam Raju, Jayasudha, Jagapathi Babu and Ramya Krishna, with music composed by Raj–Koti. The film was a Hit at the box office. The film won two Nandi Awards.

Plot 
The film begins with Bapineedu (Captain Raju), a vicious person contesting in the city mayor elections. Gandhi Raju (Jaya Bhaskar), a labor union leader, stands as his opponent whom Bapineedu slaughters by using his henchmen Ganapathi (Chalapathi Rao). Jailor Chakrapani (Krishnam Raju) catches and makes him prison. Chakrapani leads a very happy life with his wife Savitri (Jayasudha), daughters Jyothi (Srikanya) and Bujji (Baby Nikhita), the only thing that bothers him is, his son Raja (Jagapathi Babu) is a vagabond, and their house becomes a battlefield with father and son's quarrels. Raja falls in love with Vyjayanthi (Ramya Krishna), daughter of Ankineedu (Gokina Rama Rao), a multimillionaire, partner to Bapineedu. Meanwhile, at the time of elections, Gandhi Raju's seat is allocated to his wife Kasthuri (Siva Parvati). Now Bapineedu requires Ganapathi for rigging. So, he reaches Chakrapani, tries to bribe him, but he necks him out when Bapineedu develops an enmity against Chakrapani. The election completes; before counting, Bapineedu decides to change ballot boxes, and he is caught red-handed by Lalitha (Rajitha), daughter of Gandhi Raju, and Bapineedu's son Vicky (Srihari) tries to kill her, but she escapes with serious wounds, and she is spotted by Raja and a Doctor, K. K. Rao (Murali Mohan), who gives her first-aid and asks Raja to immediately take her to the hospital, but unfortunately, she dies in Raja's hands. Now Bapineedu indicts Raja, also manipulates the court by bribing the people, and Raja has been given the death sentence. The rest of the story is about how Chakrapani protects his son Raja and whether they would be able to find the witness, Dr. K. K. Rao.

Cast

Soundtrack 

Music composed by Raj–Koti. Lyrics were written by Veturi. Music released on Supreme Music Company.

Awards
Nandi  Awards -1994
Best Character Actor - Krishnam  Raju
Best Character Actress - Jayasudha

References

External links 

 

1990s action drama films
1990s Telugu-language films
1994 drama films
1994 films
Cross-dressing in Indian films
Fictional portrayals of the Andhra Pradesh Police
Films directed by Sarath
Films scored by Raj–Koti
Films set in prison
Indian action drama films
Indian courtroom films
Indian prison films
Indian romantic action films